Assinia affinis is a species of beetle in the family Cerambycidae. It was described by Téocchi and Sudre in 2002.

References

Apomecynini
Beetles described in 2002